Tony Wallin (born: 8 March 1957 Spånga, death: 3 April 2004 Farsta) is a sailor from Sweden. who represented his country at the 1988 Summer Olympics in Busan, South Korea as crew member in the Soling. With helmsman Lennart Persson and fellow crew members Eje Öberg they took the 8th place.

References

1958 births
2004 deaths
Sailors at the 1988 Summer Olympics – Soling
Olympic sailors of Sweden
Swedish male sailors (sport)